Markiyan Kamysh (born 19 October 1988) is a Ukrainian novelist.

Biography
Markiyan Kamysh is the only person who represents the Chernobyl underground in literature. Since 2010, he has been illegally exploring the Chernobyl Exclusion Zone. He is the son of a Chernobyl liquidator, nuclear physicist and design engineer of the Institute for Nuclear Research who died in 2003. In 2005–2009, Markiyan studied at the Faculty of History of the Taras Shevchenko National University of Kyiv, but dropped out shortly before receiving his bachelor's degree to devote himself to literature and illegal research in the Chernobyl zone. In 2010–2021, an illegal stalker of Chernobyl.

Stalking the Atomic City: Life among the decadent and the depraved of Chornobyl 
Stalking the Atomic City: Life among the decadent and the depraved of Chornobyl is a novel about illegal pilgrimage into the Chernobyl zone. The book has been available online since spring 2014. TOP10 books of 2019 according to La Repubblica as one of the "Constellations of the ten books that best reflect the spirit of the times".

In June 2022, Kamysh volunteered for the Ukrainian military to fight against the Russian invasion.

External links 
Ukrainian Chornobyl
Pripyat Underground
The Wall Street Journal review
 Interview about Pripyat and illegal trips
Duckweed
The River

References

Ukrainian novelists
Ukrainian male writers
21st-century novelists
Writers from Kyiv
People from Pripyat
People from Chornobyl
Chernobyl disaster in fiction
21st-century male writers
1988 births
Living people